Roman Horák (born 24 September 1969) is a Czech former professional ice hockey centre.

Career
Horák first played in the Czechoslovak First Ice Hockey League for HC České Budějovice and HK Dukla Trenčín and also played in the Czech Extraliga for České Budějovice, HC Sparta Praha and HC Havířov, following the separation of Czechoslovakia.

Horák also played in Germany's Deutsche Eishockey Liga, playing one game EHC 80 Nürnberg during the 1994-95 season, followed by a second spell with Nürnberg (now known as the Ice Tigers) in 1997. He also spent a season in Finland's SM-liiga for Ässät.

Horák was a member of the Czechoslovakia national team and the Czech Republic national team. He played for the Czech Republic at the 1994 Winter Olympics.

Personal life
His son Roman Horák, is also a hockey player playing currently for the Växjö Lakers of the Swedish Hockey League.

Career statistics

Regular season and playoffs

International

References

External links

1969 births
Czech ice hockey centres
Czechoslovak ice hockey centres
Ice hockey players at the 1994 Winter Olympics
Living people
Olympic ice hockey players of the Czech Republic
Sportspeople from České Budějovice
Motor České Budějovice players
Ässät players
HK Dukla Trenčín players
HC Havířov players
Nürnberg Ice Tigers players
HC Sparta Praha players
Czech expatriate ice hockey players in Finland
Czech expatriate ice hockey players in Germany